The Melanchthonhaus is a writer's house museum in the German town of Lutherstadt Wittenberg. It is a Renaissance building with late Gothic arched windows and the broad-tiered gables. It includes the study of the influential Protestant Reformer Philipp Melanchthon, who lived there with his family. In 1954 the house became a museum on Melanchthon's life and work displaying paintings, prints and manuscripts by him and his contemporaries. In 1996, the building became a UNESCO World Heritage Site along with sites associated with Melanchthon's contemporary Martin Luther in Witternberg and Eisleben because of their religious significance and the lasting, global influence of Protestantism.

References

External links 
 Melanchthonhaus Wittenberg
 The Melanchthonhaus in Wittenberg and its owners

Houses completed in the 16th century
Buildings and structures in Wittenberg
Martin Luther
World Heritage Sites in Germany
Biographical museums in Germany
Literary museums in Germany
Museums established in 1954